Eisstadion Davos is an indoor arena in Davos, Switzerland. It is primarily used for ice hockey and is the home arena of HC Davos. It holds 7,080 people, of which 3,280 are seated. Every year the Spengler Cup is played in this arena.

Major renovation of the arena started at the conclusion of the 2017-18 season to upgrade most of the stands and the concourse. The seating capacity will not be increased and the total cost should be around CHF 27 million. Construction began in 2018 and is expected to be completed by 2021.

Speed skating
The open natural ice rink beside the arena, Eisstadion Davos,  was in the past (up until 1997) the venue for many international speed skating events and many speed skating world records have been broken here. It still continues to be used for Swiss Championships in speed skating. It is an outdoor, natural, ice rink (as opposed to ice rinks that are indoor and/or use artificial ice) and lies 1,560 metres (almost one mile) above sea level.

For the high velocities achieved in speed skating, high altitudes are favorable due to lower air drag, and since the ice conditions produced were also often very favorable, many World Records were set in Davos, beginning with Peder Østlund who set four records in 1898. The arena also had a reputation for variable conditions, the sun or warm winds could play havoc with ice conditions throughout a championship.

Bandy
Bandy has also been played at the Eisstadion. Apart from local games, the 1913 European Bandy Championships was held at the site and a four nation bandy tournament was held here in 2014.

Ice hockey

At the beginning of the 20th century HC Davos played home games at an outdoor ice rink. The first attempt to cover the ice rink came around 1970. Soon after work began on the wooden enclosure, the project was stopped because of a lack of funds.

In 1979 HC Davos, qualified for the Nationalliga A and a covered rink was necessary. Construction finished on the wooden structure, allowing the team to participate in the 1979/80 season. It was not until the 1981/82 season that the arena was then "closed" by glass panes.

In 1998 the west tribune was renovated and instead of a big standing area, a two-level section with plastic seats was built. At that time the arena could hold up to 7,680 people.

In summer 2005 a new, modern, tribune was built, which included the restaurant “Nordside”, VIP rooms, a sector for sponsors, and new changing rooms were built in the northern sector. Capacity was subsequently reduced by the new construction to 7,080 people. The renovations continued in 2006 with small investments in the security of the southern and eastern tribune and screens for advertising.

In January 2007 the indoor ice-hockey rink was renamed "Vaillant Arena" after the Vaillant Group paid CHF 3 million to help fund future renovations.

See also
 List of indoor arenas in Switzerland

References

External links

Eisstadion Davos at SkateResults.com

Indoor arenas in Switzerland
Indoor ice hockey venues in Switzerland
Speed skating venues
Bandy venues
Sport in Davos
Buildings and structures in Graubünden
HC Davos
Spengler Cup
1979 establishments in Switzerland
Sports venues completed in 1979
20th-century architecture in Switzerland